The Forester-class gunboat was a class of 4-gun composite gunboats built for the Royal Navy between 1874 and 1877.  Although half had been sold by 1890, the rest survived into the 20th century as coal hulks, base vessels and other secondary uses. Foxhound survived as a hulk on the Blackwall Reach of the Thames until 1975, when she was broken up. They were built of composite construction, that is, with iron keel, stem and stern posts, and iron framing, but planked with wood.

Design and construction
Designed by Nathaniel Barnaby, Chief Constructor of the Royal Navy, the Forester-class gunboats were similar in every respect to the preceding s. They were fitted with a 2-cylinder horizontal compound-expansion steam engine, although Moorhen and Sheldrake received a single-expansion direct-acting steam engine. They were armed with two  64-pounder (56cwt) muzzle-loading rifles and two  20-pounder Armstrong breech loaders. All 4 guns were mounted on traversing carriages. All the ships of the class carried a three-masted barquentine rig.

Ships

Notes

References

 
 Forester
Gunboat classes